Francesco Giugno (1577 - c. 1621) was an Italian painter of the late Mannerist and early-Baroque periods, mainly active in Brescia and Mantua.

Born in Brescia, he became a pupil of Pietro Marone, and then of Palma il Giovane. He died in Mantua.

References

1577 births
1620s deaths
16th-century Italian painters
Italian male painters
17th-century Italian painters
Painters from Brescia